The term  in the Imperial Japanese Army was used in a different ways to designate a variety of large military formations, corresponding to the army group, field army and corps in the militaries of western nations.

General Armies

The  was the highest level in the organizational structure of the Imperial Japanese Army. It corresponded to the army group in western military terminology. Intended to be self-sufficient for indefinite periods, the general armies were commanded by either a field marshal or a full general.

The initial General Army was the Japanese Manchurian Army, formed from 1904–1905 during the Russo-Japanese War as a temporary command structure to coordinate the efforts of several Japanese armies in the campaign against Imperial Russia.

In terms of a permanent standing organization, the Japanese Army created the Kantōgun, usually known in English as the Kwantung Army, to manage its overseas deployment in the Kwantung Territory and Manchukuo from 1906.

Subsequent general armies were created in response to the needs of the Second Sino-Japanese War and World War II, in which increased overseas deployment called for an organizational structure that could respond quickly and autonomously from the Imperial Japanese Army General Staff in Tokyo. As a result, Japanese forces were re-organized into three separate overseas operational commands: (Manchuria, China and Southeast Asia), with the Japanese home islands forming a fourth.

Towards the end of World War II, the home island command (i.e. the General Defense Command) was restructured geographically into the First General Army in the east, Second General Army in the west, and the Air General Army in charge of military aviation.

With the official Japanese surrender in September 1945, all of the general armies were dissolved, except for the First General Army, which continued to exist until November 30, 1945, as the 1st Demobilization Headquarters.

Area Armies
 in Japanese military terminology were equivalent to field armies in western militaries. Area Armies were normally commanded by a general or lieutenant general. There is much confusion between the similarly numbered Area Armies and Armies in historical records, as many writers often did not make a clear distinction when describing the units involved.

Armies
The Japanese  corresponded to an army corps in American or British military terminology. It was usually commanded by a lieutenant general.
 
First Army – China
Second Army – China
Third Army – Manchukuo
Fourth Army – Manchukuo
Fifth Army – Manchukuo
Sixth Army – Manchukuo
Tenth Army – China
Eleventh Army – China
Twelfth Army – China
Thirteenth Army – China
Fourteenth Army – Philippines
Fifteenth Army – Burma
Sixteenth Army – Java
Seventeenth Army – Solomon Islands
Eighteenth Army – New Guinea
Nineteenth Army – eastern Netherlands East Indies
Twentieth Army – China
Twenty-First Army – China
Twenty-Second Army – China
Twenty-Third Army – China
Twenty-Fifth Army – Malaya, Singapore, Sumatra
Twenty-Seventh Army – Chishima Islands 
Twenty-Eighth Army – Burma
Twenty-Ninth Army – British Malaya  
Thirtieth Army – Manchukuo
Thirty-First Army – Truk
Thirty-Second Army – Okinawa
Thirty-Third Army – Burma
Thirty-Fourth Army – Manchukuo
Thirty-Fifth Army – Philippines
Thirty-Sixth Army – Japanese home islands 
Thirty-Seventh Army – Borneo
Thirty-Eighth Army -Indochina
Thirty-Ninth Army -Thailand
Fortieth Army – Japanese home islands 
Forty-First Army  – Philippines 
Forty-Third Army  – China
Forty-Fourth Army – Manchukuo
Fiftieth Army – Japanese home islands 
Fifty-First Army  – Japanese home islands 
Fifty-Second Army  – Japanese home islands 
Fifty-Third Army  – Japanese home islands 
Fifty-Fourth Army  – Japanese home islands 
Fifty-Fifth Army  – Japanese home islands 
Fifty-Sixth Army  – Japanese home islands 
Fifty-Seventh Army  – Japanese home islands 
Fifty-Eighth Army  – Korea
Fifty-Ninth Army  – Japanese home islands 
China Garrison Army – China
Mongolia Garrison Army- Inner Mongolia
Army of Tokyo Bay
Tokyo defense Army
Imperial Japanese Army Air Force
 First Air Army – HQ Tokyo, basing in the Kanto Plain covering the Japanese home islands, Taiwan, Korea and Karafuto.
 Second Air Army – HQ Hsinking, covering Manchukuo
 Third Air Army – HQ Singapore, covering Southeast Asia
 Fourth Air Army – HQ Rabaul, covering the Solomon Islands and New Guinea
 Fifth Air Army – HQ Nanking, covering Japanese-occupied portions of southern and eastern China.
 Sixth Air Army – HQ Kyūshū covering Taiwan and Okinawa

Auxiliaries
Manchukuo Imperial Army
Mengjiang National Army
Indian National Army
Burmese National Army
Kempeitai
Japanese Korean Army

References
Organizations of Imperial Japanese Army & Navy

Japanese Army
 
Japan in World War II-related lists